Anoop Bikram Shahi (also Anup Bikram Shahi) (Nepali language: अनुप बिक्रम शाहि) is a Nepali model and actor. He was Manhunt International Nepal 2013–2015, and represented Nepal at the Manhunt International Competition held at the Shenzhen Haiya Grand Theatre in Shenzhen, China in October 2016. Shahi is also the winner of the D Cine Award 2015 for Best Actor in a Negative Role for the movie Hasiya. He is now a television personality as well. He is a famous gang leader of the popular Nepali adventure reality show Himalaya Roadies. He is associated with this show since 3rd season of this franchise.

Filmography 
Mero Maya Timilai – 2011
Dravya –  2012
Sourya – 2013
Hasiya – 2014
Thamel.com – 2015
How Funny – 2016
Bir Bikram – 2016
King – 2016
Rani – 2017
Kamaley ko Bihe  - 2017 : Premiered in Hong Kong and U.K. but not released in theatres in Nepal.
Kri – 2018
Hurray – 2018
Lily Bily – 2018
Birangana – 2018
Jhamak Bahadur – 2018
Jay Shambho  –  2018
Purano Bullet – 2019
Cops  –  2019
Xira  - 2019
Password - 2019
Commander  -   2020
Lappan Chhappan 2 - 2022
Lakhey  -   2022
Jaar  -  Upcoming

References

External links 

21st-century Nepalese male actors
Nepalese male models
Living people
Manhunt International winners
1982 births